This is a list of notable Rijksmonuments in Flevoland. They are listed by municipality.

Almere

Dronten

Lelystad

Noordoostpolder

See List of Rijksmonuments in Noordoostpolder

Urk
See List of Rijksmonuments in Urk

Zeewolde

Flevoland